The Last Laugh is the third album by Helios Creed, released in 1989 through Amphetamine Reptile Records.

Track listing

Personnel 
Musicians
Helios Creed – vocals, guitar, production
Daniel House – bass guitar
Jason Finn – drums
Production and additional personnel
Jack Endino – production
Tom Hazelmyer – cover art
Charles Peterson – photography

References

External links 
 

1989 albums
Albums produced by Jack Endino
Amphetamine Reptile Records albums
Helios Creed albums